Mondial may refer to:
 Mondial (amusement ride manufacturer)
 Mondial (motorcycle manufacturer)
 Mondial House
 Mondial (company), a Brazilian electronics company
 Mondial language, an international auxiliary language
 Ferrari Mondial, an automobile manufactured from 1980 to 1993